The Polifonica de Puig-reig is a choral organization from Puig-Reig in Catalonia that was created in 1968 as Cor Juveneil Saranista (The Sardanista Youth Choir) coming from the Sardanista group of the same name. In 1987 the name changed to Polifónica de Puig-reig. From the group's founding in 1967 Ramon Noguera had served as its director for 46 years, and it is currently co-directed by Emmanuel Niubó and Josep Maria Conangla.

From its inception, the choir has carried out a trajectory of growing musical activity that has led it to perform all over Catalonia, Europe and other places around the world. In 1992, Poifonica accompanied le President de la Generalitat de Catalunya on an official trip to Argentina and Chile. Despite being an amateur choir it collaborates with other professionals such as the Liceau.

Bibliography 

 Serra Rotés, Rosa; Viladés i Llorens, Ramon. La Polifònica de Puig-reig. 25è aniversari. Berga: Ajuntament de Puig-reig i Polifònica de Puig-reig, 1993. ISBN 84-606-1217-1.

References 

Spanish choirs